Reyare Thomas (born 23 November 1987) is a Trinidadian sprinter. She competed at the 2015 World Championships in Beijing winning the bronze in the 4 × 100 metres relay and reaching the semifinals in the 200 metres.

Biography
Thomas took up running in high school and started competing internationally in 2011. The same year she had a hamstring injury that put her out of training for six weeks. She studied in the United States and has degrees in social sciences from the Iowa Central Community College and Abilene Christian University. At Abilene she worked as an assistant sprints coach.

International competitions

1Did not finish in the final

Personal bests
Outdoor
100 metres – 11.22 (+1.4 m/s, Port of Spain 2015)
200 metres – 22.82 (+0.8 m/s, Port of Spain 2015)
Indoor
60 metres – 7.37 (Charleston 2012)
200 metres – 23.51 (Birmingham, AL 2013)

References

External links

1987 births
Living people
Trinidad and Tobago female sprinters
World Athletics Championships athletes for Trinidad and Tobago
Athletes (track and field) at the 2007 Pan American Games
Athletes (track and field) at the 2014 Commonwealth Games
Athletes (track and field) at the 2015 Pan American Games
Athletes (track and field) at the 2016 Summer Olympics
Athletes (track and field) at the 2018 Commonwealth Games
Olympic athletes of Trinidad and Tobago
People from Chaguanas
World Athletics Championships medalists
Commonwealth Games competitors for Trinidad and Tobago
Central American and Caribbean Games silver medalists for Trinidad and Tobago
Competitors at the 2010 Central American and Caribbean Games
Competitors at the 2018 Central American and Caribbean Games
Central American and Caribbean Games medalists in athletics
Pan American Games competitors for Trinidad and Tobago
Olympic female sprinters